Toczyski may refer to the following places in Poland:

Toczyski Podborne
Toczyski Średnie